A CDMA Mobile Test Set is a call simulating device that is used to test CDMA cell phones. It provides a network-like environment forming a platform to test the cell phone. This reduces cost of manufacturing and testing the cell phone in a real environment. It can be used to test all major 2G, 2.5G, 3G and 3.5G wireless technologies.
In a lab, high-precision measurement correction over the entire frequency and dynamic range as well as compensation for temperature effects in realtime are critical factors for achieving accuracy. A good quality mobile test set helps in achieving excellent accuracy, which is a major concern for mobile manufacturers.

Technologies supported
A mobile test set should ideally support the following technologies:
CDMA2000
WCDMA
Bluetooth
GSM
1xEVDO
Analog
TDMA

Tests that can be performed
RF (Antenna)
Audio
LC Display
DUT Camera and Keypad
Other DUT Interfaces

Companies that manufacture Mobile test set
Rohde & Schwarz
Agilent
Anritsu

Product Types
Agilent 8960 
Agilent 8924C (Older model) 
R&S CMU200 Universal Radio Communication Tester
Anritsu MT8820C 
Anritsu MT8870A 
Anritsu MD8475A

References
Agilent Technologies, http://www.home.agilent.com/agilent/product.jspx?nid=-536900143.0.00&lc=eng&cc=US

Rohde & Schwarz International, http://www2.rohde-schwarz.com/en/products/test_and_measurement/product_categories/mobile_radio/

Anritsu Corporation, http://www.anritsu.com/en-US/Products-Solutions/Test-Measurement/Mobile-Wireless-Communications/Handset-One-Box-Testers/index.aspx

Electronic test equipment